St. Cloud or Saint Cloud is a city in northern Osceola County, Florida, United States. The population was 35,183 in the 2010 census, and 54,579 in the 2019 census estimate. The city is part of the Orlando–Kissimmee–Sanford metropolitan area.

St. Cloud was founded as a retirement community for Civil War union veterans, and gained the nickname "The Friendly Soldier City".

History 

During the 1870s, Hamilton Disston of Philadelphia took an interest in developing the region while on fishing trips with Henry Shelton Sanford, founder of the city of Sanford. Disston contracted with the Florida Internal Improvement Fund, then in receivership, to pay $1 million to offset its Civil War and Reconstruction debt. In exchange, Disston was awarded half the land he drained from the state's swamps. He dug canals and, in 1886–1887, established St. Cloud sugarcane plantation, named after St. Cloud, Minnesota, although many longtime locals claim the town was named after Saint-Cloud, France.

Disston opened the Sugar Belt Railway to the South Florida Railroad in 1888 to carry his product to market. But the Panic of 1893 dropped land values, and the Great Freeze of 1894–1895 ruined the plantation. Disston returned to Philadelphia, where he died in 1896. The Sugar Belt Railway merged into the South Florida Railroad. An attempt to cultivate rice in the area failed, and for several years the land remained fallow. Then in 1909, the Seminole Land & Investment Company acquired  as the site for a Grand Army of the Republic veterans' colony. St. Cloud was selected because of its "health, climate and productiveness of soil." It was first permanently settled in 1909 by William G. King, a real estate manager from Alachua County who had been given the responsibility "to plan, locate and develop a town."

On April 16, 1909, the Kissimmee Valley Gazette announced the "New Town of St. Cloud", a "Soldiers Colony" near Kissimmee. The newspaper called the Seminole Land and Investment Company's purchase "one of the most important real estate deals ever made in the State of Florida." It was reported that the company had searched all over Florida for the perfect site for a veterans' colony, particularly one suited for "health, climate, and productiveness of the soil". It is believed that many of the streets were named for states from which the Civil War veterans had served, but the street names were already assigned to the platted land before settlement occurred.

Early St. Cloud is believed to have  history as a Sundown Town with a plot of land outside the city reserved for black residents officially dubbed “Colored Quarter.” This name is still active on official land records as the title of this section of land. Early newspaper records support the history of being a “Sundown Town” with firsthand accounts of local residents making attempts “to keep the colored folks in their own quarters outside the town.” 

On June 1, 1915, the Florida Legislature incorporated St. Cloud as a city. Its downtown features landmark buildings by the Orlando architectural firm Ryan & Roberts, a partnership consisting of two women. The buildings by Ryan and Roberts and others downtown are predominantly Spanish Revival.

St. Cloud has tried to separate itself from neighboring cities, and particularly the theme parks, by promoting an image of small-town life, and by attempting to make itself economically less dependent on Kissimmee. On March 6, 2006, St. Cloud introduced the CyberSpot program, becoming the first city in the United States to give residents free high-speed wireless Internet access, but the program ended in 2009.

Geography 

The major highway is U.S. Route 192 running in tandem with U.S. Route 441 east and west. This six-lane road is intersected by avenues running north and south. Many have names of US states in no particular order.

Demographics 

As of the census of 2000, there were 20,074 people, 6,716 households, and 5,424 families residing in the city. The racial makeup of the city was 90.27% White, 2.07% African American, 0.47% Native American, 0.95% Asian, 0.07% Pacific Islander, 4.10% from other races, and 2.06% from two or more races. Hispanic or Latino of any race were 13.36% of the population.

There were 7,716 households, out of which 34.0% had children under the age of 18 living with them, 52.8% were married couples living together, 12.8% had a female householder with no husband present, and 29.7% were non-families. 23.7% of all households were made up of individuals, and 11.9% had someone living alone who was 65 years of age or older. The average household size was 2.55 and the average family size was 3.00.

In the city, the population was spread out, with 25.5% under the age of 18, 7.7% from 18 to 24, 29.7% from 25 to 44, 19.7% from 45 to 64, and 17.4% who were 65 years of age or older. The median age was 37 years. For every 100 females, there were 90.8 males. For every 100 females age 18 and over, there were 85.4 males.

The median income for a household in the city was $36,467, and the median income for a family was $41,211. Males had a median income of $30,955 versus $22,414 for females. The per capita income for the city was $17,031. About 6.2% of families and 8.1% of the population were below the poverty line, including 8.7% of those under age 18 and 8.3% of those age 65 or over.

As of 2010 the population of St. Cloud was 35,183. The racial and ethnic composition of the population was 62.1% non-Hispanic white, 7.2% at least partly African American, 1.0% at least partly Native American, 2.5% at least partly Asian, 0.3% at least partly Pacific Islander, 0.4% non-Hispanic reporting some other race and 29.2% Hispanic or Latino. Puerto Ricans by themselves made up 18.7% of the population and were by far the largest Hispanic group.

The median age of St. Cloud's population was 36.8 years. 7.8% of the population was 65 or older. There were 12,565 households with 9,145 of them constituting families.

Education 

Elementary Schools
 Hickory Tree Elementary School (HTE)
 Lakeview Elementary School (LVES)
 Michigan Avenue Elementary School (MES)
 St. Cloud Elementary School 
 Narcoossee Elementary School (NCES)
 Harmony Elementary School (HCES)
 Neptune Elementary School
 Canoe Creek K–8 (Formerly Canoe Creek Charter)

Middle Schools
 St. Cloud Middle School (SCMS)
 Narcoossee Middle School (NCMS)
 Neptune Middle School (NMS)
 Harmony Middle School (HCMS)

High Schools
 Harmony High School (HHS) (Although HHS is not within the city limits (about 15 miles east), students in the eastern part of city limits along with 1/3 of the south portion of the city attend this school)
 St. Cloud High School (SCHS)

Parochial Schools
 St. Thomas Aquinas Catholic School (Pre-K–8)

Charter Schools
 St. Cloud Preparatory Academy (K–9) CLOSED as of 2022
 Creative Inspiration Journey School (K–5)
 American Classical Charter Academy (K–8) CLOSED as of 2022
 Mater Academy (K–8)
 BridgePrep Academy (K-8)

Private Schools
 St. Cloud Christian Preparatory School (K–12)
 City Of Life Christian Academy (Pre-K–12)

Public library 

The Veteran's Memorial St. Cloud Library is home to the city of St. Cloud. The branch library is in a remodeled Suntrust bank five blocks away from historic downtown St. Cloud. Its hours are Monday-Saturday from 9am to 6pm. The branch offers many programs, such as LIVE storytimes, virtual bookclubs and over 50,000 volumes.

History of Veterans Memorial Library 

The first form of a library in St. Cloud was in 1910 when the new woman's club set up a traveling library and a table at the train station with reading materials for locals. By 1911, there was a reading room that was purchased on Pennsylvania Avenue that the ladies of the town worked to make comfortable and stocked with things to read. Within the next couple of years the collection had outgrown the reading room and moved to the People's Bank and then City Hall. In 1915, the town began fundraising to build a proper building. These efforts were put on hold temporarily while war efforts were made a priority. When 1922 rolled around, it was decided that there was enough money to pay an architect to begin planning and building. The contract price was for $4,506.20. The building was extremely well-built and designed with many updated features, including electricity. On February 17, 1923, the new library was dedicated and named "Veteran's Memorial Library" which remains today. 

From 1923–1968 Veteran's Memorial Library was operated and taken care of by the Woman's Club of St. Cloud. It was in 1968 that it officially became part of the Osceola County Library System. The location of the library collection moved in 1972–1974 into a former bank on the corner of New York Avenue and 10th Street. At this point, the original building because a thrift store to benefit the Red Cross and other groups. In 2001 the building was purchased by The City of St. Cloud and with the help of other organizations was planned to become a museum. The grand opening of The St. Cloud Heritage Museum (pictured below) was held on February 17, 2005.

While the St. Cloud Heritage Museum still proudly boasts the name "Veteran's Memorial Library", the branch location was moved to a former SunTrust bank building on 13th Street and Indiana Avenue in 1995 where it still operates today as part of the Osceola County Library System.

Sites of interest 

 Reptile World Serpentarium
 St. Cloud Heritage Museum
 Wild Florida
 Lakefront Park
 Bounce N Around Rentals

Notable people

Dave Cianelli, former NFL football player and former lobbyist
Sam Riggs, country music singer-songwriter
The Supervillains, five-piece reggae band

References in popular media

The album Saint Cloud by Waxahatchee gets its name from the city.

Play (and film) based in St. Cloud
Sweet Bird of Youth (1959), by Tennessee Williams

Films shot in St. Cloud
Two Thousand Maniacs! (1964), directed by Herschell Gordon Lewis, starring Connie Mason, William Kerwin and Jeffrey Allen
The Waterboy (1998), starring Adam Sandler, Henry Winkler, and Kathy Bates
Barracuda (1978), starring Wayne Crawford, Jason Evers, William Kerwin

References

External links

 St. Cloud official website
 Osceola County Library System
 History of St. Cloud, Florida
 History of the St. Cloud Hotel
 Bounce N Around Rentals

 
Cities in Osceola County, Florida
Greater Orlando
Populated places established in 1909
Cities in Florida
1909 establishments in Florida